Bluefish is a free and open-source software advanced text editor with a variety of tools for programming and website development. It supports coding languages including HTML, XHTML, CSS, XML, PHP, C, C++, JavaScript, Java, Go, Vala, Ada, D, SQL, Perl, ColdFusion, JSP, Python, Ruby, and shell. It is available for many platforms, including Linux, macOS and Windows, and can be used via integration with GNOME or run as a stand-alone application. Designed as a compromise between plain text editors and full programming IDEs, Bluefish is lightweight, fast and easy to learn, while providing many IDE features. It has been translated into 17 languages.

Features
Bluefish's wizards can be used to assist in task completion. Its other features include syntax highlighting, auto-completion, code folding, auto-recovery, upload/download functionality, a code-aware spell-checker, a Unicode character browser, code navigation, and bookmarks. It has a multiple document interface that can quickly load codebases or websites, and it has many tools search-and-replace tools that can be used with scripts and regular expressions. It can store the current states of projects to reopen them in that state. Zencoding/emmet is supported for web development.  

Bluefish is extensible via plugins and scripts. Many scripts come preconfigured, including statical code analysis, and syntax and markup checks for many different markup and programming languages.

History 
Bluefish was started by Chris Mazuc and Olivier Sessink in 1997 to facilitate web development professionals on Linux desktop platforms. Its development has been continued by a changing group of professional web developers under project organizer Olivier Sessink. It was originally called Thtml editor, which was considered too cryptic; then Prosite, which was abandoned to avoid clashes with web-development companies already using that name. The name Bluefish was chosen after a logo (a child's drawing of a blue fish) was proposed on its mailing list. Since version 1.0, the original logo was replaced with a new, more polished one.

Source code and development 
Bluefish is written in C and uses the cross-platform GTK library for its GUI widgets. Markup and programming language support is defined in XML files. Bluefish has a plugin API in C, but it has been used mainly to separate non-maintained parts (such as the infobrowser-plugin) from maintained parts. A few Python plugins exist as well, but they need a C plugin to interact with the main program. Bluefish also supports very loosely coupled plugins: external scripts that read standard input and return their results via standard output can be configured by the user in the preferences panel. It uses autoconf/automake to configure and set up its build environment. Both llvm and GCC can be used to compile Bluefish. On Windows, MinGW is used to build the binaries.

Reception
A Softpedia review found the software powerful, feature-rich and easy to use.

See also 

 Comparison of HTML editors
 List of HTML editors
 List of PHP editors
 List of text editors

References

External links

 Bluefish: The Definitive Guide
 Interview with main developer Olivier Sessink

Free integrated development environments
HTML editors
Free HTML editors
Web development software
Linux integrated development environments
Linux text editors
Software using the GPL license
Text editors that use GTK
MacOS text editors